Jimmy Brown (1956 – 18 August 1992) was a militant Irish republican and drug dealer who was a member of Fianna Eireann, the Official IRA, then Irish Republican Socialist Party (IRSP)/ Irish National Liberation Army (INLA), and latterly of the Irish People's Liberation Organisation (IPLO).

Biography
Brown was born on Broadway Road near the Falls Road in west Belfast. As a teenager, he was a member of Fianna Eireann and in 1969, upon the onset of the Troubles, he joined the Official IRA where he was a member of their "intelligence department". Within the OIRA, Brown was a member of the Seamus Costello faction which split off as their own organisation in 1974. Their faction became the Irish National Liberation Army, with the Irish Republican Socialist Party as their political wing. Brown did not immediately follow Costello into the INLA, instead remaining within the OIRA until early 1976 as a spy. After that, Brown openly joined the INLA and in December 1977 Brown was made a member of IRSP's ard comhairle (executive committee). Thereafter Browne acted as both a political spokesman and an "intelligence officer" who planned bombings and shootings. Those who admired Brown gave him the moniker "the Professor" because of his skill with Marxist rhetoric while his detractors mocked him by calling him "the Clown", due to his involvement in several high-profile blunders.

Extended police custody
Brown was closely associated with childhood friend and neighbour Gerard Steenson, and in December 1981 Brown supported Steenson's attempt to seize control of the INLA. By February 1983 Brown was chairman of the IRSP's Belfast branch; that same month he contested a Belfast City Council by-election. However, during his campaign, he was arrested alongside Steenson and other leading Belfast INLA members after INLA member Rab McAllister became an informant to the police. In March 1983 McAllister retracted his testimony, but Brown and the rest of the detained INLA members were still held because of the evidence of another informer, Jackie Grimley. In December 1983 the INLA members were put before the court, but Lord Justice Maurice Gibson deemed Grimley, a petty criminal, unreliable. Nevertheless, Brown and the INLA members continued to be held when a third informer, Harry Kirkpatrick, gave evidence against them. During this time period, Brown used his time in court during bail applicants to make political speeches. He also created political articles and letters. In December 1985 Brown and the INLA members were convicted of terrorism on Kirkpatrick's evidence, but one year later in December 1986, their sentences were overturned on appeal.

Republican infighting
In 1982 "Mad Dog" Dominic McGlinchey had become the leader of the INLA, however, in 1984, McGlinchy was captured while Brown was still in jail. Without McGlinchy, a power vacuum was created within the INLA. One faction fell behind Belfast's John O'Reilly, while others formed together as an anti-O'Reilly block. Brown was part of the anti-O'Reilly group, and as a result O'Reilly tried to personally kill Brown's girlfriend in October 1984, while in the summer of 1985, Brown was attacked by O'Reilly followers while in prison.  

Upon the release of the Brown/Steenson group, they sought retaliation against the O'Reilly group, a feud that would see 11 people killed. As O'Reilly retained the INLA label, the Brown/Steenson group renamed themselves the 
Irish People's Liberation Organisation (paramilitary) and Republican Socialist Collective (political) respectfully.  

Steenson was shot dead on 14 March 1987, leaving Brown the principal political leader of the IPLO/RSC. Brown by this point had moved to Dublin, where his affable personality won over many in the media and far-left circle, leading them to assume Brown was in control of both the IPLO and RSC. However, behind the scenes, Brown was increasingly losing control of the IPLO to the gunmen who filled its ranks. In the late 1980s, the IPLO carried out a series of high-profile assassinations of Loyalist leaders but also a number of mindless attacks on Loyalist pubs in which people were targetted at random. Brown handwaved any criticism of the attacks using his Marxist rhetoric.   

By 1989 the IPLO had turned to drug dealing in order to fund the purchase of more weapons. Brown oversaw these operations, using the same routes the IPLO had previously used to ship arms. When this was put to Brown, he would occasionally justify the IPLO's actions by nothing drug dealing by other Marxist paramilitary groups internationally such as FARC. It was also around this time that the IPLO began an "open door" policy, allowing criminals and those rejected by other paramilitary groups into their ranks without barriers. This upset many other republican groups and the IPLO's notoriety soared. By late 1991, the Provisional IRA began to make clear it was not happy with the IPLO and started to threaten action. Brown retorted back by threatening to stand in Gerry Adams' West Belfast constituency as a spoiler candidate, so that the SDLP could take the seat. Brown also declared that if he was attacked, he would have the IPLO assassinate leading members of Sinn Féin. Paradoxically, Brown also suggested, as an alternative, that all Irish Republican groups should band together as a "broad front".   

By 1991 it's alleged that IPLO drug dealing had stripped the IPLO/RSC of any remaining political credibility they had and left them solely a criminal gang. In August 1991 it was alleged that the IPLO collaborated with loyalists to kill former IPLO gunman Martin O'Prey in a dispute over profits. Following the robbery of a post office in Whiterock, the IPLO split into two groups, the "Army Council" and the "Belfast Brigade". Each side accused the other of drug dealing, collaborating with Loyalists and of working with the British as informants. 
 
Brown was killed by the Belfast Brigade on  18 August 1992 in West Belfast. Disguised by the entire matter, the Provisional IRA moved in and attacked both groups. Weak, leaderless and demoralised, both versions of the IPLO "surrendered" to the PIRA.

Legacy
Historian Patrick Maume described Brown's life as a waste of talent, stating "Some sympathy can be felt for [Brown] as a self-educated working-class boy, shaped by the sectarian violence of the early troubles and seeking in Marxism a tool to make sense of the world. A devious man who deceived himself, he provided an ideological veneer for sectarian murder and criminality, and expanded paramilitary involvement in drug dealing."

Personal life
Brown's son, Emmet McDonough Brown, was elected as an Alliance Party of Northern Ireland member of Belfast City Council at the 2014 Northern Ireland local elections.

Sources
 Jack Holland & Henry McDonald, INLA - Deadly Divisions, Publisher: Torc (1994); /

References

1956 births
1992 deaths
Deaths by firearm in Northern Ireland
Irish National Liberation Army members
Irish People's Liberation Organisation
Irish Republican Socialist Party politicians
Irish republicans
People killed during The Troubles (Northern Ireland)
Politicians from Belfast
Criminals from Belfast